Halaevalu Mata'aho ʻAhomeʻe (29 May 1926 – 19 February 2017) was Queen of Tonga from 1965 to 2006, as the wife of King Tāufaʻāhau Tupou IV. She was the mother of King George Tupou V and the current King of Tonga, Tupou VI.

Biography 
Halaevalu Mataʻaho ʻAhomeʻe was born on 29 May 1926, the eldest daughter of The Hon. Tevita Manu-’o-pangai, ‘Ahome’e, sometime Governor of Vava’u and Ha’apai and Minister for Police and his wife, Heuʻifanga Veikune, a great-granddaughter of the Tu'i Tonga. She was also a great-great-granddaughter of Enele Maʻafu.

Education
She was educated at St Joseph's Convent School, Nuku’alofa, and St Mary's College, in Auckland, New Zealand.

Marriage
On 10 June 1946, Halaevalu married her distant relative Crown Prince Tāufaʻāhau of Tonga (eldest son of Queen Sālote Tupou III of Tonga (1900-1965) and Prince Viliami Tungī Mailefihi).

The Queen Mother celebrated her 85th birthday in 2011 with a five-day celebration held in May. The celebrations began with a garden party for more than one hundred Tongan women held at the home of the President of the Free Wesleyan Church of Tonga, Rev. Dr. ‘Ahio. The Queen Mother attended a Roman Catholic mass at St. Mary's Cathedral in Ma'ufanga with King Siaosi Tupou V on May 26, 2011. The Tongan Ministry of Education, Women Affairs and Culture held a student celebration for her birthday on May 27, with primary school students from Pangai Lahi to Teufaiva Park, presenting the Queen Mother with birthday gifts. A private party was held in Ha'avakatolo the next day, followed by a church service held at the Centennial Church on Sunday, May 29, and a luncheon at the Royal Palace in Nukuʻalofa.

The Queen Mother embarked on a two-week trip to the U.S. state of Utah in July and August 2011. Specifically, the Queen Mother came to visit the Tongan United Methodist Church in West Valley City, Utah, whose congregation had raised approximately $500,000 in less than a year to pay off the mortgage on the building. The Mayor of West Valley City, Michael K. Winder, awarded the Queen Mother the key to the city on July 27, 2011. She also met with Utah Governor Gary Herbert the next day.

Death
On 19 February 2017, the Queen Mother died aged 90, which was confirmed by her granddaughter Princess Lātūfuipeka Tukuʻaho, High Commissioner of Tonga to Australia, a week after she was flown to Auckland, New Zealand, for minor medical issues; the cause of death, however, was not released publicly.

The Queen Mother was flown back to Tonga by the Royal Beechcraft G.18S Aircraft
on February 28 flanked by the C-130 Hercules of the Royal New Zealand Air Force, after lying-in-state at the Tongan royal residence, 'Atalanga in Epsom, Auckland.

Honours

National
 : Knight Grand Cross with Collar of the Order of Pouono
 : Knight Grand Cross with Collar of the Order of the Crown
 : Knight Grand Cross of the Order Order of Sālote Tupou III
 : Dame of the King George Tupou V Royal Family Order
 : Recipient of the Red Cross Medal
 : Recipient of the King Tupou VI Coronation Medal
 : Recipient of the King George Tupou V Coronation Medal
 : Recipient of the King Tāufaʻāhau Tupou IV Silver Jubilee Medal

Foreign
 : Grand Cross of the Order of Merit of the Federal Republic of Germany, Special Class
 : Paulownia Dame Grand Cordon of the Order of the Precious Crown
 : Grand Cross of the Order of Propitious Clouds
 : Recipient of the Queen Elizabeth II Coronation Medal
 : Recipient of the Queen Elizabeth II Silver Jubilee Medal

Ancestry
See the Tongan language page and ancestor's page ...

Family tree

References

1926 births
2017 deaths
Tongan nobles
Tongan royal consorts
Queen mothers
Princesses by marriage
Grand Crosses Special Class of the Order of Merit of the Federal Republic of Germany
Order of the Precious Crown members
Grand Cordons of the Order of the Precious Crown
Dames Grand Cross of the Order of the Crown of Tonga
People educated at St Mary's College, Auckland
20th-century Tongan women
21st-century Tongan women
20th-century Tongan people
21st-century Tongan people